These 2005 NESTEA European Championship Final (or the 2005 European Beach Volleyball Championships) was held from June 25 to June 28, 2005 in Moscow, Russia. It was the thirteenth official edition of the men's event, which started in 1993, while the women competed for the twelfth time.

It was the first year Nestea was the title partner of the event, even though it had been the main partner from 2003.

Men's competition
 A total number of 24 participating couples

Women's competition
 A total number of 24 participating couples

References

External links
 Beach Volleyball Results

2005
E
B
B
Beach volleyball
June 2005 sports events in Russia
2005 in Moscow